Bülent Ataman (born June 19, 1974) is a Turkish retired footballer. He was last playing for Fethiyespor.

Career 

He has previously played for Ofspor, Erzurumspor, Beşiktaş J.K., Düzcespor, Trabzonspor, Göztepe A.Ş., Manisaspor, Altay, Karabükspor and Karşıyaka.

Now, he is an owner of Sporium Center in Tokat.

References

External links 
 Profile at TFF.org

1974 births
Living people
Turkish footballers
Manisaspor footballers
Beşiktaş J.K. footballers
Trabzonspor footballers
Göztepe S.K. footballers
Erzurumspor footballers
Kardemir Karabükspor footballers
Karşıyaka S.K. footballers
Association football goalkeepers